Egypt, also known as Pikeville, is an unincorporated community in Chickasaw County, Mississippi, United States.

Egypt is located on the former Gulf, Mobile and Ohio Railroad and was home to a depot. Egypt also had two churches, an academy, a broom factory, a grist mill, and a Munger System cotton gin.

A post office operated under the name Pikeville from 1844 to 1859 and under the name Egypt from 1859 to 1979.

The Battle of Egypt Station was fought on December 28, 1864, when Brigadier General Benjamin Grierson's Union cavalry division defeated an outnumbered Confederate force led by Samuel J. Gholson and Franklin Gardner. The Union raiders were intent on damaging the railroad before heading southwest to Vicksburg.   

This community was devastated by EF-3 tornadoes on April 27, 2011.

References

Unincorporated communities in Chickasaw County, Mississippi
Unincorporated communities in Mississippi